Applied Media Technologies Corporation (AMTC) was a Tampa, Florida-based provider of commercial sound equipment, "on hold" messaging to US and Canadian businesses under the brand name TelAdvantage, and provided background music for businesses as a partner of SIRIUS Satellite Radio.

TelAdvantage 
AMTC's clients included Allstate Insurance, Morgan Stanley, Spherion and Raymond James Financial.  In 2008, the TelAdvantage offering was expanded to include overhead messaging in retail stores and automotive showrooms. AMTC had manufactured two digital MP3 player devices for this purpose, the iQueue 3.5 and the RemoteLink IP. They are also in the final stages of testing with their new device which will control music, video and on hold messaging from the same device eliminating the need for multiple devices separating themselves from other providers.

Sirius Music for Business 
Sirius Music for Business is used in hotels, retail stores, automotive dealerships and restaurant chains, including Big Boy Restaurants and Huddle House. In 2006, AMTC executed agreements to install Sirius Business in Yum! Brands, Focus Brands and Wendy's stores, among others. AMTC's SIRIUS offering is featured in many of the same automotive dealerships that sell Sirius in cars, including Ford Motor Company, Volkswagen of America, Volvo, Chrysler, Land Rover, Jaguar, and Mazda among others.

Commercial sound equipment 
In conjunction with its two music offerings, AMTC manufactures branded 70 V and 100 V commercial sound equipment. The product line included amplifiers ranging from 8 W to 1400 W, wired and wireless paging microphones, and an array of speakers, including recess-mount models, surface-mount box speakers, and specialty speakers for outdoor use.

Timeline 
 1991 - AMTC begins operations in Tampa, Florida as an on-hold messaging vendor.
 1993 - AMTC releases its patented Optical Disk Repeater 1000. The device was the first compact disc-based "on hold" player on the market. 
 1998 - AMTC revamps the ODR-1000 with its TraxMaster, and added the iQueue (a  removable memory card player) and the RemoteLink td64, which permitted remote-initiated downloading of messages via a modem. 
 2000 - AMTC moves into its new  headquarters in Clearwater, Florida
 2000 - AMTC installs its RemoteLink td64 in every Bally Total Fitness gym.
 2003 - AMTC signs agreement with ABMC to distribute Sirius Satellite Radio for businesses.
 2003 - AMTC introduces a third CD-based "on hold" player, the TraxMaster II, and releases the iQueue II, a CompactFlash-based MP3 player for "on hold" messaging. The iQueue II works in conjunction with HoldDirect.com, the first web-based distribution system for "on hold" messages.
 2004 - AMTC becomes a preferred on-hold messaging vendor for Nationwide Insurance and rolls out its iQueue II digital messaging player to the offices of Royal Caribbean.
 2005 - Major endorsements and partnerships include Daimler-Chrysler, Ford Motor Company, Raymond James Financial, and Allstate Insurance.
 2006 - Major partnership deals signed include Yum! Brands, FOCUS Brands, Huddle House, Big Boy Restaurants, Piggly Wiggly, Cici's Pizza, Sysco Foodservice and Wendy's International.
 2007 - AMTC announces national rollouts of Sirius Business to Volkswagen of America dealers and McCoy's Building Supply stores.
 2007 - AMTC announces it has updated all the components in the Sirius Business Equipment Kit and promises more product updates this year.
 2007 - AMTC installs SIRIUS service in the new team headquarters of the Tampa Bay Buccaneers and the speakers and amplifiers driving the Mountain Dew Extreme Zone in Tropicana Field, home of the Tampa Bay Rays.
 2008 - AMTC becomes the national music and messaging vendor for True Value and its subsidiaries, as well as Anytime Fitness and Snap Fitness, among others.
 2008 - AMTC more than doubles its sound equipment line, offering several new rack-mountable amplifiers and specialty speakers.
 2009 - AMTC releases the iQueue 3.5, an updated version of the iQueue III, as well as the RemoteLink IP, an Internet-based store and forward MP3 player device for on-hold and in-store music and messaging.
 2009 - AMTC renews its reseller contract with ABMC through 2012.
 2015-  AMTC is in the final testing stages of their RAV player, the first all in one background music, video, and on hold messaging device, which they hope will revolutionize the industry and heighten the standards for business sound forever.

See also 
 DMX Music
 In-Store Broadcasting Network
 Muzak Holdings
 Playnetwork
 Trusonic

References 

 Hotel Interactive - Article covering AMTC's agreement with the Four Seasons Hotel Silicon Valley
 AMTC agrees to install TelAdvantage in Woodfin Suites locations

 National Piggly Wiggly Owner's Association - Piggly Wiggly endorses AMTC/Sirius as their preferred background music provider
 American Express Restaurant Briefing March-April 2006 - AMEX discusses the particulars of Sirius Business, VP Sales/Marketing Clayton Burton quoted

External links 
 Applied Media Technologies Corporation's official site
 AMTC Business Music Corporation's official site
 AMTC's SIRIUS Music for Business site
 AMTC's TelAdvantage site

Industrial music services
Companies based in Clearwater, Florida
Business services companies established in 1991
Sirius Satellite Radio
XM Satellite Radio
1991 establishments in Florida
Sirius XM